Nigel Higgins (born 1980 in Rathnure, County Wexford) is an Irish sportsperson.  He plays hurling with his local club Rathnure and was a member of the Wexford senior inter-county team from 2005 until 2007.

References 

 

1980 births
Living people
Rathnure hurlers
Wexford inter-county hurlers